Historic Dodgertown is a multi-sport facility in Vero Beach, Florida where athletes of all ages and skill levels have the opportunity to train, play, and stay together.  The facility which includes the historic Holman Stadium was originally created as a Navy housing base, and was transformed into the home of spring training for Los Angeles Dodgers baseball team, as well as the Vero Beach Dodgers from 1980 to 2006, and the Vero Beach Devil Rays from 2007 to 2008.  It has since evolved into a multi-sport destination that includes an option of room and board via their on-site villas.

History
Historic Dodgertown was originally built as a Navy housing base for all of the members of the Navy and Marines that trained at the US Naval Air Station during World War II that was located directly across the street.  When Branch Rickey began looking for a permanent spring training site in 1948 he was introduced to a large area of land in Vero Beach, Florida by Bud Holman, a local businessman, as the perfect place to host a fully contained training camp for the Major League club as well as the other 26 minor league teams.  The Dodgers and the city of Vero Beach ended up coming to an initial five-year lease agreement that included the naming of the property as "Dodger Town".  A stadium was completed in 1953.

The Los Angeles Dodgers eventually left Vero Beach, Florida for a new spring training home in Arizona after the 2008 spring training season ended.

Once the Los Angeles Dodgers departed, Historic Dodgertown closed its doors and shut down due to financial instability. Minor League Baseball reopened the facilities and renamed it Vero Beach Sports Village. That change did not last long as they were set to close again in 2012. Then Peter O'Malley with the help of his sister Terry O’Malley Seidler and two ex-Dodgers pitchers Chan Ho Park and Hideo Nomo reinvested into Historic Dodgertown.

Historic Dodgertown became a Florida Heritage Landmark on November 10, 2014. In 2019, Dodgertown became the first sports facility to be added to U.S. Civil Rights Trail.

Modern use

Historic Dodgertown is a multi-sport destination facility that hosts all levels of a variety of sports including professional teams. Some notable teams that Historic Dodgertown has played host to include:

High School and college baseball teams utilize the complex heavily from February through April as a spring break destination as they prepare for their season.

Montreal Alouettes and former NFL player Chad Johnson utilized Historic Dodgertown's facilities for their mini-camp program. Chad Johnson was a member of the team at the time and was present during mini-camp during their stay. The team returned the following year for mini-camp in April 2015 as well.

Edmonton Eskimos utilized Historic Dodgertown's facilities for their mini-camp program in April 2015.

SK Wyverns of the Korea Baseball Organization based in Incheon brought their program to Historic Dodgertown in February 2015. The SK Wyverns are a South Korean based team and are linked to a founding partner of Historic Dodgertown Chan Ho Park who is from South Korea.

Historic Dodgertown yearly tournaments

Treasure Coast Presidents's Day Challenge - Holiday weekend tournament beginning in February that takes place over President's Day or classically referred to as Washington's Birthday.

Memorial Day Invitational - Holiday weekend tournament taking place in May over Memorial Day.

Legends Classic - Week-long tournament in late June that includes a cookout and skills challenge hosted by Historic Dodgertown.

Independence Day Classic - Holiday weekend tournament during Independence Day (United States).

All Star Classic - Week-long tournament hosted in the beginning of August.

Labor Day Beach Bash - Holiday weekend tournament over Labor Day

Executives
 Peter O'Malley - President and CEO, Historic Dodgertown
 Terry O'Malley Seidler - Founding Partner
 Chan Ho Park - Founding Partner
 Hideo Nomo - Founding Partner
 Craig Callan - Senior Vice President
 Jeff Biddle - Vice President
 Steve Snure - Vice President
 Ruth Ruiz - Director, Marketing and Communications

Jackie Robinson Celebration Game
This game hosts two Class A Florida State League teams every year on April 15, to commemorate the date in which Jackie Robinson broke the color barrier in Major League Baseball.  On April 15, 2014, the Lakeland Flying Tigers and Brevard County Manatees participated in the first professional regular season game at Holman Stadium since the Vero Beach Devil Rays departed Vero Beach after the 2008 season.

The Brevard County Manatees and St. Lucie Mets participated in the Second Annual Jackie Robinson Celebration Game on April 15, 2015, to a near capacity crowd of 5,915 spectators.

MLB Elite Development Invitational

Major League Baseball, USA Baseball, and the Major League Baseball Players Association hosted their first Elite Development Invitational at Historic Dodgertown. This event was created and implemented by MLB for the purpose of revitalizing youth baseball across the United States and Canada. The 150 players invited were ages 13–16 years old from major cities across the United States. The kids were brought to Vero Beach, Florida to develop and hone their skills by some of the best players to play in the MLB. The list of coaches includes:

Maury Wills - "The National League's MVP Award winner in 1962. He won three World Series titles, two Gold Glove Awards and earned seven All-Star berths. He stole 104 bases in 1962, which was a Major League record at the time."

Lee Smith - "Seven-time All-Star pitcher, who held the Major League career saves record for more than a decade before he was passed by Trevor Hoffman in 2006. Smith, at 6-feet-6 and 265 pounds, was a dominant force in baseball throughout the 1980s and '90s."

Dusty Baker - "Former outfielder Dusty Baker, who helped the Dodgers win the World Series in 1981. He was a two-time All-Star, won two Silver Slugger Awards, one Gold Glove and one NL Championship Series MVP Award. He was also a three-time Manager of the Year, taking the Giants, Reds and Cubs to the postseason."

The coaching staff included numerous current and former major league baseball players.

MLB executives visit

On July 28, 2015, MLB commissioner Rob Manfred visited the camp and spoke to the young participants. Joining him were Harold Reynolds of the MLB Network, CEO and President of Minor League Baseball Pat O'Conner, and Hall of Fame manager Joe Torre. With his visit, Manfred became the 9th  Commissioner of Baseball to have visited.

References

External links

Baseball venues in Florida
Major League Baseball
Los Angeles Dodgers
1948 establishments in Florida
Sports complexes in Florida